The 2007 Nextel Open and Nextel All-Star Challenge was a professional auto race held on Saturday, May 19, 2007, at Lowe's Motor Speedway in Concord, North Carolina, a suburb of Charlotte.  Native Carolinian and former NBA superstar Michael Jordan was the grand marshal of the event.

Race and qualifying format

All-Star Challenge
The race is unique to its "All-Star Game" format, much like those in the other North American major "stick and ball" sports (baseball, football, basketball and hockey).  Only race winners (either drivers or teams) in the 2006 and the first eleven races of the 2007 seasons, plus former Winston/Nextel Cup Champions and All-Star event winners from the past decade (covering the span between 1997 and 2006) automatically qualify for the main event. A description on how the race was  reformatted for the 2007 running can be found here.  The race also awards no points as it is an exhibition race, meaning drivers can take greater risks than they normally would do in a regular event.  In addition, on restarts of the race after caution flags, the cars line up in a double file restart, akin to the start of a regulation race.

Qualifying for this event is abnormal to the standards of NASCAR.  Those entered for the main event take three timed qualifying laps (instead of the usual two laps used in all sanctioned oval races), but they must take a required pit stop for four tires after either the first or second lap, coming in at the pit road speed (in the case of LMS, 45 miles per hour), but come out at full throttle.  This puts a premium on the pit crew teams to be fast like regular pit stops, and to even out the field, pit box No. 22 is used for all qualifiers.  Infractions will also incur time penalties.  Also starting in 2007, the selection of the pit boxes used by teams were made after the annual Pit Crew Challenge event to be held three days earlier at Charlotte Bobcats Arena, won by the Ryan Newman No. 12 team.  In the qualifying, Matt Kenseth won the pole. Kevin Harvick was bumper-to-bumper with Jimmie Johnson coming to the start/finish line to win the race.

Nextel Open
All other drivers or teams that are in the Nextel Cup Top 50 owners or drivers points that do not automatically qualify for the All-Star Challenge are entered into a 40-lap, two-half event called the Nextel Open.  Only the top two drivers, plus one additional driver on the lead lap that is voted in by fans on the World Wide Web via Sprint/Nextel's web site, their customers and attendees of the race, join the elite field.  Standard qualifying rules applied for those in this event, which saw Carl Edwards win "P-1" (a/k./a the pole position), edging fellow Roush-Fenway teammate David Ragan. The Nextel Open was won by Martin Truex Jr. Johnny Sauter finished second.

Kobalt Tools Crew Chief Race
Before the All-Star Challenge, a new preliminary race was held between Nextel Cup crew chiefs—the Kobalt Tools Crew Chief Race. The race comprised eighteen crew chiefs driving small Legends Thunder Roadster cars on the quarter-mile oval in front of the main track's grandstand, and was televised in the United States on Speed. NASCAR on ESPN color commentator and former crew chief, Andy Petree won the main event, earning a $10,000 donation for any charity of his choice. The charities he decided to donate the race winnings to were Motor Racing Outreach and Mud Creek Baptist Church.

List of 2007 qualifiers

The following drivers qualified after they won at least one race in the 2006 or 2007 seasons, in order of their qualifying win:

 Jimmie Johnson - 2006 Daytona 500
 Matt Kenseth - 2006 Auto Club 500
 Kasey Kahne - 2006 Golden Corral 500
 Kurt Busch - 2006 Food City 500
 Tony Stewart - 2006 DirecTV 500
 Kevin Harvick - 2006 Subway Fresh 500
 Dale Earnhardt Jr. - 2006 Crown Royal 400
 Greg Biffle - 2006 Dodge Charger 500
 Denny Hamlin - 2006 Pocono 500
 Jeff Gordon - 2006 Dodge/Save Mart 350
 Kyle Busch - 2006 Lenox Industrial Tools 300
 Jeff Burton - 2006 Dover 400
 Brian Vickers - 2006 UAW Ford 500 (drove the No. 25 Hendrick Motorsports car)

The following drivers qualified as a result of driving a car that won a race in 2006 with a different driver:

 Casey Mears - No. 25 car won the 2006 UAW Ford 500

The following drivers qualified as a result of being a former Nextel Cup champion (since 1997):

 Jeff Gordon (1997, 1998 and 2001 Champion, already qualified)
 Dale Jarrett (1999 Champion)
 Bobby Labonte (2000 Champion)
 Tony Stewart (2002 and 2005 Champion, already qualified)
 Matt Kenseth (2003 Champion, already qualified)
 Kurt Busch (2004 Champion, already qualified)
 Jimmie Johnson (2006 Champion, already qualified)

The following drivers qualified as a result of being a former winner of the Nextel All-Star Challenge (since 1997):

 Jeff Gordon (1997 and 2001 winner, already qualified)
 Mark Martin (1998 and 2005 winner, already qualified)
 1999 winner was Terry Labonte, who retired after the 2006 season and did not compete
 Dale Earnhardt Jr. (2000 winner, already qualified)
 Ryan Newman (2002 winner)
 Jimmie Johnson (2003 and 2006 winner, already qualified)
 Matt Kenseth (2004 winner, already qualified)

The following drivers qualified via the Nextel Open:

 Martin Truex Jr. (won the Nextel Open)
 Johnny Sauter (finished 2nd in the Nextel Open)

Also qualifying, the 2007 Fan Vote Winner:

 Kenny Wallace

Entry List

The Open
 (R) = Rookie

All-Star Challenge

Qualifying

The Open

All-Star Challenge

* - Won the Showdown

** - Showdown runner up

*** - Fan Vote winner

The Open
Martin Truex Jr. won the Nextel Open, which was the first win for him of any kind in a Nextel Cup race.  Johnny Sauter edged out Carl Edwards for the second transfer spot on offer in this race.

The 40-lap race was stopped four times due to caution, including a 10-car incident halfway through lap 1 in which, among other things, the hoods of the cars driven by David Gilliland and Juan Pablo Montoya collided into each other.

As mentioned above, Kenny Wallace won the fan vote, partly a credit to a large get out the vote campaign mounted by Speed Channel, where he works as an analyst.

The Challenge
Kevin Harvick passed Jeff Burton at the start of the fourth and final segment and never looked back to win the main event race for the first time in his career.  Harvick won $1,031,539 for the victory, the largest amount ever for an all-star race winner. Jimmie Johnson finished second, and Mark Martin was third.

Burton had inherited the lead from Matt Kenseth, who was sent to the tail end of the longest line due to speeding on pit road during the break between segments three and four.  (During this break, teams had to at least visit the pits, but no service was required.  Kenseth decided on the visit.)  Kenseth had also won the first segment. Kyle Busch was first at the end of the second segment.

It was the fourth win for Richard Childress Racing, after three wins by Dale Earnhardt.

This race was also notable for a crash brothers Kurt Busch and Kyle Busch were involved. They touched entering turn 1 with 18 laps to go, sending both into the wall rear-first. In the Speed Channel interview, Kurt joked that he would not "be eating Kellogg's anytime soon," referring to the No. 5 Hendrick Motorsports Chevrolet's sponsor.

Results

The Open

All-Star Challenge

References

NEXTEL All-Star Challenge
NASCAR races at Charlotte Motor Speedway
2007 in sports in North Carolina
May 2007 sports events in the United States
NASCAR All-Star Race